James E. Krier is the Earl Warren DeLano Professor Emeritus of Law at the University of Michigan Law School. His teaching and research interests are primarily in the fields of property, contracts, and law and economics, and he teaches or has taught courses on contracts, property, trusts and estates, behavioral law and economics, and pollution policy.

Biography
Krier earned his B.S. with honors and his J.D. with highest honors from the University of Wisconsin–Madison, where he was articles editor of the Wisconsin Law Review. After his graduation from law school in 1966 he served for one year as law clerk to the Hon. Roger J. Traynor, Chief Justice of the Supreme Court of California, and then practiced law for two years with Arnold & Porter in Washington, D.C. He was a professor of law at UCLA School of Law and Stanford Law School before joining the Michigan Law faculty in 1983, and has been a visiting professor at Harvard Law School, Oxford University, University of Alabama School of Law and Cardozo School of Law. In 2012, he was awarded the Brigham-Kanner Property Rights Prize from William & Mary Law School.

Krier is the father of musician/inspirational speaker Andrew W.K.

Works
Krier is the author or co-author of several books, including Environmental Law and Policy, Pollution and Policy, and the widely used casebook Property (6th edition) with Dukeminier. His recent articles have been published in the Harvard Law Review, the Supreme Court Economic Review, and the UCLA Law Review.

Publications

James E. Krier, Michael H. Schill, Gregory S. Alexander, and Jesse Dukeminier. Property (Aspen Publishers, Inc.; 2006)  
James E. Krier, Pollution and Policy: A Case Essay on California and Federal Experience With Motor Vehicle Air Pollution, 1940-1975 University of California Press (June 1978)

References

External links
James Krier faculty page at the University of Michigan Law School

American legal scholars
Legal educators
University of Wisconsin–Madison alumni
University of Wisconsin Law School alumni
Scholars of property law
University of Michigan faculty
University of Michigan Law School faculty
Living people
Arnold & Porter people
Year of birth missing (living people)